The Academy Award for Best Writing is divided into two subcategories:

Academy Award for Best Writing (Adapted Screenplay)
Academy Award for Best Writing (Original Screenplay)